Austromitra lawsi is a species of small sea snail, marine gastropod mollusk in the family Costellariidae, the ribbed miters.

References

lawsi
Gastropods described in 1930
Taxa named by Harold John Finlay